Julian Dziedzina (21 October 1930, Lesko, Poland – 21 May 2007, Łódź) was a Polish director, film critic, and a longtime lecturer at the National Film School in Łódź.

Life 
In 1956, he graduated from the Directing Department at the National Film School in Łódź. He started a puppet theater and amateur stage in Wałbrzych. He was also a film critic. As a director he made his debut with the film Koniec nocy, starring, among others, Zbigniew Cybulski and Roman Polański.

His most famous work was Bokser, with Daniel Olbrychski in the lead role. The film Field received three awards at the International Film Festival for Youth in Venice.

Dziedzina was buried in the  Starym cemetery in Łódź.

Filmography

Feature films 
 Koniec nocy (1956) – director, screenwriter
 Eroica (1957) – castmember
 Zagubione uczucia (1957) – cooperating director, screenwriter
 Miasteczko (1958) – director, screenwriter
 Decyzja (1960) – director
 Mam tu swój dom (1963) – director
 Rachunek sumienia (1964) – director, screenwriter
 Święta wojna (1965) – director
 Bokser (1966) – director
 Ortalionowy dziadek (1968) – director
 Otello z M-2 (1968) – director
 Czekam w Monte-Carlo (1969) – director
 Kryształ (1971) – director
 Mały (1970) – director
 Portfel (1970) – director
 Trochę nadziei (1971) – director
 Wizyta (1971) – director
 Bitva o Hedviku (1972) – director
 Na niebie i na ziemi (1973) – director
 Czerwone ciernie (1976) – director, screenwriter
 Umarli rzucają cień (1978) – director, screenwriter
 Tajemnica starego ogrodu (1983) – director, screenwriter

TV series 
 Ucieczka z miejsc ukochanych (1987) – director, screenwriter
 Dziewczyna z Mazur (1990) – director 
 W piątą stronę świata (1990) – director, screenwriter

References

 Julian Dziedzina at Filmweb
 Julian Dziedzina at FilmPolski
 Julian Dziedzina at E-teatr

External links 
 
 Photos of Julian Dziedzina

Łódź Film School alumni
Polish film directors
Polish theatre directors
1930 births
2007 deaths
Academic staff of Łódź Film School